Busnovi is a village in Prijedor, Republika Srpska, in northwestern Bosnia and Herzegovina. The population is 1,962 (census 1991). It is near to Omarska.

Notable individuals
 Jefrem Milutinović

References

Cities and towns in Republika Srpska
Prijedor